Tales of Pirates (also 海盗王 Pirate King Online or King of Pirates Online in China) was a 3D massively multiplayer online role-playing video game developed by the Chinese company MOLI and published by IGG. The game takes place in a pirate-like environment with a top-view camera and takes inspiration cues from manga series like One Piece. In 2011, IGG released a direct sequel called Tales of Pirates 2, letting users migrate their characters from the previous game. Tales of Pirates 2 subsequently closed on February 29, 2016.

Discontinuation
On January 25, 2016, IGG announced they would discontinue their latest iteration of the game, Tales of Pirates 2. The game and its website officially closed on February 29, 2016.

References

External links
 Tales of Pirates Official Website

2007 video games
Massively multiplayer online role-playing games
Video games about pirates
Video games developed in China
Windows-only freeware games
Trade simulation games
Lua (programming language)-scripted video games
Windows games
Windows-only games
Inactive_massively_multiplayer_online_games
Products and services discontinued in 2016